Entrèves  (Valdôtain:  or ) is a frazione (French: hameau) of Courmayeur in the Aosta Valley region of Italy.

Frazioni of Aosta Valley
Courmayeur